Éric Bonnel (born 18 August 1974 in Haubourdin, Nord) is a retired male weightlifter from France. He competed in three consecutive Summer Olympics for his native country, starting in 1996 (Atlanta, Georgia). His best finish was the 11th place in the men's bantamweight division (1996).

References

External links
 
 
 

1974 births
Living people
French male weightlifters
Weightlifters at the 1996 Summer Olympics
Weightlifters at the 2000 Summer Olympics
Weightlifters at the 2004 Summer Olympics
Olympic weightlifters of France
Sportspeople from Nord (French department)
Mediterranean Games bronze medalists for France
Mediterranean Games medalists in weightlifting
Competitors at the 2001 Mediterranean Games
Competitors at the 2005 Mediterranean Games
21st-century French people